Hexamethyldisilane (TMS2) is the organosilicon compound with the formula Si2(CH3)6, abbreviated  Si2Me6.  It is a colourless liquid, soluble in organic solvents.

Synthesis and reactions
Hexamethyldisilane can be produced by Wurtz-like coupling of trimethylsilyl chloride in the presence of a reducing agent such as potassium graphite:

With an excess of the reductant, the alkali metal silyl derivative is produced:

The Si-Si bond in hexamethyldisilane is cleaved by strong nucleophiles and electrophiles. Alkyl lithium compounds react as follows:
Si2Me6  +  RLi  →   RSiMe3  +  LiSiMe3

Iodine gives trimethylsilyl iodide.
Me3Si−SiMe3  +  I2  →   2 SiMe3I

References

Carbosilanes
Trimethylsilyl compounds